Eugene Taylor Sutton (born January 9, 1954) is the 14th and current Episcopal Bishop of Maryland.

Early life and education
Sutton grew up in Washington, D.C., as a Baptist. He graduated from Hope College in Holland, Michigan, in 1976 and earned a Master of Divinity degree from Western Theological Seminary in the same city and was ordained as a Minister of Word and Sacrament in the Reformed Church in America. Sutton later continued his graduate studies at the Princeton Theological Seminary. After a few years, he joined the Episcopal Church and completed his Anglican ministry training at Sewanee: The University of the South School of Theology in 1993.

Ministry
As well as serving parishes in New Jersey and Washington, DC, Sutton also taught at the New Brunswick Theological Seminary, the Vanderbilt University Divinity School, and the General Theological Seminary.

Episcopate
A convention of the Episcopal Diocese of Maryland held at St James Episcopal Church (Baltimore, Maryland) elected Sutton as bishop on the first ballot. He was consecrated at the Washington National Cathedral on June 28, 2008, where he had served as canon pastor. The first African American bishop for the Diocese of Maryland, Sutton was installed in the Cathedral of the Incarnation (Baltimore) on June 29, 2008.

See also
 List of Episcopal bishops of the United States
 Historical list of the Episcopal bishops of the United States

References

1954 births
Living people
People from Washington, D.C.
Hope College alumni
Western Theological Seminary alumni
Reformed Church in America ministers
Princeton Theological Seminary alumni
Vanderbilt University faculty
Sewanee: The University of the South alumni
General Theological Seminary faculty
Episcopal bishops of Maryland
African-American Episcopalians
Converts to Anglicanism from Baptist denominations